Emmett Sizemore was a college football player. He was a guard for coach Mike Donahue's Auburn Tigers football team, playing opposite Fatty Warren. He was later a district extension supervisor.

References

American football guards
Auburn Tigers football players
All-Southern college football players